Furnas is a parish in the Azores.

Furnas may also refer to:
Furnas (surname)
Furnas County, Nebraska
Eletrobras Furnas, a Brazilian regional electrical utility
Furnas Dam, a hydroelectric dam in Minas Gerais, Brazil